Iolaus carina is a butterfly in the family Lycaenidae. It is found in Gabon.

References

External links

Die Gross-Schmetterlinge der Erde 13: Die Afrikanischen Tagfalter. Plate XIII 68 f

Butterflies described in 1873
Iolaus (butterfly)
Endemic fauna of Gabon
Butterflies of Africa
Taxa named by William Chapman Hewitson